Ompia Party is a Muslim political party in Mindanao, Philippines. The party was founded by Dr. Mahid M. Mutilan.

The party is part of the Lakas–CMD. However, in the 2005 Autonomous Region in Muslim Mindanao election the party contested separately. It fielded two candidates for Board Member in 2016 Lanao del Sur local elections.

References

Local political parties in the Philippines
Politics of Basilan
Politics of Lanao del Sur
Politics of Maguindanao del Norte
Politics of Maguindanao del Sur
Politics of Sulu
Politics of Tawi-Tawi
Regionalist parties
Regionalist parties in the Philippines